The Obatogamau River is a tributary of the Chibougamau River, flowing into the Regional County Municipality (MRC) of Jamésie, in the Nord-du-Québec, in the province of Quebec, in Canada.

The lower and middle portions of the Obatogamau River hydrographic slope can be reached by route 113 which connects Lebel-sur-Quévillon to Chibougamau and the railway; while the northeast side of Obatogamau Lakes is accessible via route 167 and the railway. This road follows in part the valley of the Obatogamau River.

The surface of the Obatogamau River is usually frozen from early November to mid-May, however, safe ice circulation is generally from mid-November to mid-April.

Geography

Toponymy 
This hydronym is indicated on a map of 1941. Of Cree origin, the term "Obatogamau" means "tightened by wood, vegetation". This hydronym is indicated in the "Fifth Report of the Geographic Board of Canada 1904", published in Ottawa in 1905, page 46: "Obatogamau; South Lake Chibougamau Lake, Abitibi District, Que.

The toponym "Obatogamau River" was formalized on December 5, 1968, at the Commission de toponymie du Quebec, i.e. at the creation of this commission

See also

References 

Rivers of Nord-du-Québec
Nottaway River drainage basin
Eeyou Istchee James Bay